The Icelandic is the Icelandic breed of domestic sheep. It belongs to the Northern European Short-tailed group of sheep, and is larger than most breeds in that group.  It is thought that it was introduced to Iceland by Vikings in the late ninth or early tenth century.

It is generally short-legged and stocky, slender and light-boned, and usually horned, although polled and polycerate animals can occur; there is a polled strain, the Kleifa. The fleece is double-coated and may be white or a variety of other colors; the face and legs are without wool. The sheep are highly resistant to cold, and are generally left unshorn for the winter. Icelandic ewes are highly prolific, with a lambing percentage of 175–220%. The Þoka (Thoka) gene is carried by some ewes, which may give birth to large litters of lambs. A unique strain within the population is the Leader sheep, which carries a hereditary ability or predisposition to lead other sheep safely over dangerous ground.

Most Icelandic sheep have two large horns that have a spiral shape. Both male and female sheep have larger horns that are shed every year.

History 

It is thought that the sheep were introduced to Iceland by Vikings in the late ninth or early tenth century.

Breed numbers reached a peak in 1978, when there were approximately 891 000, or about four sheep for every inhabitant of Iceland. By 2007 the total number had fallen to about 450 000. In 2018 a population of just over 432 000 was reported to DAD-IS.

Characteristics 

The colors of Icelandic sheep are inherited in a similar way to those of other sheep, but they display more variety in color and pattern than most other breeds, and some variations are seen which are not seen in other sheep.  Each sheep carries three genes that affect the color of the sheep, and  each gene has dominant and recessive alleles.

Use 

Until the 1940s the Icelandic sheep was the predominant milk-producing animal in Iceland. In the twenty-first century this sheep is reared principally for meat, which accounts for more than 80% of the total income derived from sheep farming.

The fleece is double-coated, with a long outer coat which gives protection from snow and rain, and a fine inner coat which insulates the animal against the cold.

Notes

References

Further reading 

 Stefán Aðalsteinsson (1970). Colour inheritance in Icelandic sheep and relation between colour, fertility and fertilization. Journal of Agricultural Research, Iceland. 2 (1): 3–135.
 Stefán Aðalsteinsson (1975). Depressed fertility in Icelandic sheep caused by a single colour gene. Annales de génétique et de sélection animale. 7 (4): 445.
 Stefán Aðalsteinsson (1977). Albinism in Icelandic sheep. The Journal of Heredity. 68 (6): 347–349. .
 Stefán Aðalsteinsson (1983). Inheritance of colours, fur characteristics and skin quality traits in North European sheep breeds: a review. Livestock Production Science 10:555-567.
 Jón V. Jónmundsson, Stefán Aðalsteinsson (1985). Single genes for fecundity in Icelandic sheep. In: R.B. Land, D.W. Robinson (1985). Genetics of Reproduction in Sheep. London: Butterworths. , pages 159–168. .

Sheep breeds
Sheep breeds originating in Iceland